Messaoud Berkous (born 20 July 1989) is an Algerian handball player for Istres Provence Handball.

Career
Messaoud Berkous started his career with JPA Aïn El Bia in the town of Aïn Bya, Oran Province.

References

External links
 Player's profile - Eurosport

Living people
Algerian male handball players
Sportspeople from Oran
1989 births
Algerian expatriates in Qatar
Mediterranean Games competitors for Algeria
Competitors at the 2009 Mediterranean Games
Competitors at the 2018 Mediterranean Games
Competitors at the 2022 Mediterranean Games
21st-century Algerian people